Everything We Love is a live album (LP) by Norwegian guitarist Thorgeir Stubø and American guitarist Doug Raney released 1984 in Oslo, Norway by Hot Club Records – HCR 19).

Background 
This is the third album by Thorgeir Stubø released in 1984, and presents an interaction with the famous American guitarist Doug Raney, son of the legendary pioneer bopgitar, Jimmy Raney. Raney was at this time living in Denmark, and on this album Stubø made Doug Raney bring along the Danish top bassist Jesper Lungaard and drummer Ole Jacob Hansen. It was an elegant and perhaps more easily swinging quartet than the previous quintet from Jazz Alive. This time the repertoire also was a bit more conservative with the older standard songs and bop tunes like "Everything I Love" (Porter), "Half Nelson" (Miles Davis), "Love Letters" (Young), "Get out of town" (Porter) Just Friends (Klenner/Lewis), "We'll be together again" (Fisher/Lane) and "So do it" (Montgomery). The two guitarists clearly shows that they have some of the same influences, and they are relatively similar in style. Anyway, it's inequities and Stubø is rougher and a bit more angular in the performance than Raney's slightly smoother style.

Reception

The review by Allmusic awarded the album 3 stars.

Track listing
Side A
"Just Friends" (John Klenner/Sam M. Lewis) – 4:12)
"We'll Be Together Again" (Carl Fisher/Frankie Laine) – 7:27
"Half Nelson" (Miles Davis) – 6:22
 
Side B
"So Do It!" (Wes Montgomery) – 5:56
"Love Letters"   (Edward Heyman/Victor Young) – 6:34
"Get Out of Town"  (Cole Porter) – 5:07
"Ev'rything I Love" (Cole Porter) – 5:35

Personnel
Doug Raney – guitar
Thorgeir Stubø – guitar
Jesper Lundgaard – double bass
Ole Jacob Hansen – drums
Executive producer – Jon Larsen
Mastering – Krieg Wunderlich

References

Thorgeir Stubø albums
Doug Raney albums
1984 albums